Neusticurus arekuna is a species of lizard in the family Gymnophthalmidae. It is found in Venezuela and Brazil.

References

Neusticurus
Reptiles of Brazil
Reptiles of Venezuela
Reptiles described in 2018
Taxa named by Philippe J.R. Kok
Taxa named by Mátyás A. Bittenbender
Taxa named by Joris K. van den Berg
Taxa named by Sergio Marquez-Souza
Taxa named by Pedro M. Sales-Nunes
Taxa named by Alexandra E. Laking
Taxa named by Mauro Teixeira Jr.
Taxa named by Antoine Fouquet
Taxa named by D. Bruce Means
Taxa named by Ross Douglas MacCulloch
Taxa named by Miguel Trefaut Rodrigues